Sir John Luke (c. 1563 – 1638) was an English politician who sat in the House of Commons from 1610 to 1611.

Luke was the son of John Luke, of Woodend, Bedfordshire. He was knighted at Charterhouse on 11 May 1603. He was elected Member of Parliament for Newton in 1604. 
 
Luke was the uncle of  Sir Oliver Luke, the Parliamentary leader and MP for Bedfordshire in the Long Parliament.

References

1560s births
1638 deaths
English MPs 1604–1611
English MPs 1624–1625
English MPs 1625